Lubeník is a village and municipality in Revúca District in the Banská Bystrica Region of Slovakia.

External links
 
 
 Lubenik.sk
 https://web.archive.org/web/20070427022352/http://www.statistics.sk/mosmis/eng/run.html

Villages and municipalities in Revúca District